Henry Dorman (September 24, 1916 – November 9, 1998) was an American lawyer and politician. He served in the Wisconsin Senate from 1965 through 1979.

Early life and education
Born in Racine, Wisconsin to Zachary and Eva Dorman, he graduated from William Horlick High School in 1935. He received his bachelor's degree from the University of Wisconsin in 1940. He served in the United States Army Air Forces during World War II. In 1947, he received his law degree from the University of Wisconsin law school and then practiced law.

Political career
Dorman served on the Racine County Board of Supervisors from 1956 to 1958. In 1965, Dorman was elected to the Wisconsin State Senate as a Democrat. Dorman served for 14 years, but in 1978 Dorman had been indicted earlier in the year for misuse of state telephone credit cards, and was plagued by other controversies, including a nepotism scandal. He was defeated in the 1978 Democratic primary election by Joseph A. Strohl. Strohl went on to succeed Dorman in the Senate.

Family and personal life
Dorman married Jean L. Phillips on May 29, 1949, in Rochester, New York. They had four daughters.

Dorman died at St. Mary's Medical Center, in Racine, at age 82. His funeral was held at Beth Israel Sinai Temple on September 11, 1998, and he was interred in the Racine Jewish Memorial Cemetery.

Dorman was a member of Beth Israel Sinai Congregation, the Wisconsin and Racine Bar Associations, and the National Society of State Legislators.

Electoral history

References

1916 births
1998 deaths
Politicians from Racine, Wisconsin
Military personnel from Wisconsin
University of Wisconsin–Madison alumni
University of Wisconsin Law School alumni
United States Army Air Forces soldiers
Wisconsin lawyers
County supervisors in Wisconsin
Democratic Party Wisconsin state senators
20th-century American lawyers
20th-century American politicians
William Horlick High School alumni